Jasik may refer to:

 Jasik (Pale), a village in Bosnia and Herzegovina
 Jasik (Sokolac), a village in Bosnia and Herzegovina